Giuseppe Turini (10 March 1927 – 21 February 2018) was an Italian politician.

Born in San Miniato in 1927, he represented Grosseto in the Senate between 1992 and 2001, first as a member of the Italian Social Movement and later the National Alliance. He died at the age of 90 on 21 February 2018, at a hospital in Massa Marittima.

References

1927 births
2018 deaths
People from San Miniato
Italian Social Movement politicians
National Alliance (Italy) politicians
Senators of Legislature XI of Italy
Senators of Legislature XII of Italy
Senators of Legislature XIII of Italy
Politicians of Tuscany